Endoxyla is a genus of moths in the family Cossidae.

Species

 Endoxyla acontucha
 Endoxyla affinis
 Endoxyla amphiplecta
 Endoxyla angasii
 Endoxyla biarpiti
 Endoxyla bipustulata
 Endoxyla celebesa
 Endoxyla cinereus
 Endoxyla columbina
 Endoxyla coscinopa
 Endoxyla coscinophanes
 Endoxyla coscinota
 Endoxyla decorata
 Endoxyla dictyoschema
 Endoxyla didymoplaca
 Endoxyla donovani
 Endoxyla duponchelli
 Endoxyla edwardsi
 Endoxyla eluta
 Endoxyla encalypti
 Endoxyla episticha
 Endoxyla eremonoma
 Endoxyla eumitra
 Endoxyla euplecta
 Endoxyla euryphaea
 Endoxyla fusca
 Endoxyla grisea
 Endoxyla houlberti
 Endoxyla interlucens
 Endoxyla leucomochla
 Endoxyla lichenea
 Endoxyla lituratus
 Endoxyla mackeri
 Endoxyla macleayi
 Endoxyla magnifica
 Endoxyla magniguttata
 Endoxyla methychroa
 Endoxyla meyi
 Endoxyla minutiscripta
 Endoxyla nebulosa
 Endoxyla nephocosma
 Endoxyla neuroxantha
 Endoxyla nubila
 Endoxyla opposita
 Endoxyla perigypsa
 Endoxyla phaeocosma
 Endoxyla polyplecta
 Endoxyla polyploca
 Endoxyla pulchra
 Endoxyla punctifimbria
 Endoxyla reticulosa
 Endoxyla secta
 Endoxyla sordida
 Endoxyla stenoptila
 Endoxyla tanyctena
 Endoxyla tenebrifer
 Endoxyla tigrina
 Endoxyla turneri
 Endoxyla vittata
 Endoxyla zophoplecta
 Endoxyla zophospila

References

External links
Natural History Museum Lepidoptera generic names catalog